Marovo can refer to:
Marovo Island, an island in the Solomon Islands
Marovo Lagoon, a lagoon in the Solomon Islands.
Marovo language, a language spoken on islands in and around the lagoon.